Kōmyō ga Tsuji (功名が辻) is a 2006 Japanese historical television series, and the 45th NHK taiga drama. It is written by Shizuka Ōishi, based on the 1965 novel of the same name by Ryōtarō Shiba. The series chronicles the lives of Chiyo and Yamauchi Kazutoyo, a couple who lived during the Sengoku period of Japan.

Cast

Chiyo and Kazutoyo
Yukie Nakama as Chiyo, wife of Kazutoyo
Anzu Nagai as young Chiyo
Takaya Kamikawa as Yamauchi Kazutoyo, samurai and later Lord of Tosa
Shingo Michinaka as young Kazutoyo

Their family
Yoshiko Sakuma as Hōshūin
Hiroshi Tamaki as Yamauchi Yasutoyo
Masahiko Tsugawa as Fuwa Ichinojō
Yumi Takigawa as Kinu
Shin Takuma as Wakamiya Kisuke
Tae Kimura as Tomo
Ei Morisako as Yone
Haruma Miura as Shōnan

Goto and Sofue clan
Tetsuya Takeda as Goto Kichibei
Gin Maeda as Sofue Shinemon
Mami Kumagai as Fune
Manabu Hamada as Sofue Shin'ichirō
Shinnosuke Furumoto as Sofue Tokushinsai

Horio clan
Katsuhisa Namase as Horio Yoshiharu
Junko Mihara as Ito
Atsuo Ōuchi as Horio Tadauji

Nakamura clan
Atsushi Tamura as Nakamura Kazuuji
Otoha as Toshi
Momoki Yamada as Yokota Naizen

Oda clan
Hiroshi Tachi as Oda Nobunaga
Mao Daichi as Oichi
Emi Wakui as Nōhime
Seiji Iinuma as Oda Nobutaka
Kunihiko Ōchiba as Oda Nobukatsu
Yūki Fujita as Sanbōshi
Bandō Mitsugorō X as Akechi Mitsuhide
Hiroshi Katsuno as Shibata Katsuie
Tatsuo Nadaka as Niwa Nagahide
Shunsuke Kariya as Hayashi Michikatsu
Tōta Tawaragi as Sakuma Nobumori
Shinji Furukawa as Takigawa Kazumasu
Dai Watanabe as Mori Ranmaru

Toyotomi clan
Akira Emoto as Toyotomi Hideyoshi
Yūko Asano as Nene
Hiromi Nagasaku as Chacha
Mao Noguchi as young Chacha
Hiroki Narimiya as Toyotomi Hidetsugu
Reita Shibai as young Hidetsugu
Kin Sugai as Naka
Akiko Matsumoto as Asahi
Goro Noguchi as Soeda Jinbei
Masahiro Kobayashi as Gensuke
Junichi Haruta as Toyotomi Hidenaga
Hideo Ishiguro as Toyotomi Hideyori
Nakamura Hashinosuke III as Ishida Mitsunari
Michitaka Tsutsui as Takenaka Hanbei
Yoshihiro Takayama as Hachisuka Koroku
Yōsuke Saitō as Kuroda Kanbei
Hideaki Tamiya as Kuroda Nagamasa
Norihito Kaneko as Katō Kiyomasa
Hironari Arashi as Fukushima Masanori

Tokugawa clan
Toshiyuki Nishida as Tokugawa Ieyasu
Nakamura Baijaku II as Tokugawa Hidetada
Ayami Tsuru as Senhime
Ken Tanaka as Honda Sakuzaemon
Eisuke Sasai as Ii Naomasa
Tarō Kawano as Sakakibara Yasumasa
Nobuhiko Takada ad Honda Tadakatsu
Hiroshi Ōkōchi as Ishikawa Kazumasa
Junpei Morita as Sakai Tadatsugu
Ryō Amamiya as Honda Masazumi
Susumu Nihashi as Hattori Hanzō

Hosokawa clan
Masaomi Kondō as Hosokawa Yūsai
Kyōko Hasegawa as Hosokawa Gracia
Manabu Ino as Hosokawa Tadaoki
Kyūsaku Shimada as Ogasawara Shōsai
Mariko Tsutsui as Kiyo

Azai clan
Takaaki Enoki as Azai Nagamasa
Kei Yamamoto as Azai Hisamasa
Ayato Kosugi as Manpukumaru
Maiko Kikkawa as Hatsu
Rina Matsumoto as young Hatsu
Erika Niibo as Gō
Nichika Hara as young Gō

Saitō clan
Kazuma Kudō as Saitō Tatsuoki
Tasuku Uno as Andō Morinari
Hideki Oshikiri as Hineno Hironari
Toshiya Tanaka as Ujiie Bokuzen
Takashi Kuramoto as Inaba Ittetsu

Mōri clan
Masane Tsukayama as Mōri Terumoto
Moro Moro'oka as Kikkawa Hiroie
Shōichirō Akaboshi as Ankokuji Ekei
Hiroyuki Kinoshita as Shimizu Muneharu

Ashikaga shogunate
Kōki Mitani as Ashikaga Yoshiaki
Yoshiyuki Yamaguchi as Ashikaga Yoshiteru

Others
Teruyuki Kagawa as Rokuheita
Masami Nagasawa as Korin
Sayuri Ishikawa as Setsu
Tōru Emori as Imagawa Yoshimoto
Tokio Emoto as Emperor Go-Yōzei
Tōru Shinagawa as Matsunaga Hisahide
Hiroyuki Sakamoto as Kobayakawa Hideaki
Hiroshi Iwasaki as Shimazu Yoshihiro
Ryō Tamura as Shimazu Toyohisa
Ken Yasuda as Ukita Hideie
Kenichi Yajima as Naoe Kanetsugu
Toshiaki Karasawa as Maeda Toshiie

Production
The 45th taiga drama was announced to be Kōmyō ga Tsuji on July 16, 2004, with Yukie Nakama and Takaya Kamikawa starring in the lead roles of Chiyo and Yamauchi Kazutoyo respectively.

Toshiaki Karasawa made a cameo appearance as Maeda Toshiie, a protagonist of the 2002 taiga drama.

As the series was in the middle of its run with high ratings, chief producer Akimasa Oda remarked that the series' success is likely due to its lead couple's ordinariness and industrious attitude.

Home media
The first 27 episodes of Kōmyō ga Tsuji were released by NHK within one DVD box set on January 25, 2007. The remaining 22 episodes were released in a separate box set on March 21, 2007.

Soundtrack
NHK Taiga Drama "Kōmyō ga Tsuji" Original Soundtrack (Release date: May 10, 2006)

References

External links
NHK website

Taiga drama
2006 Japanese television series debuts
2006 Japanese television series endings
Cultural depictions of Akechi Mitsuhide
Cultural depictions of Oda Nobunaga
Cultural depictions of Tokugawa Ieyasu
Cultural depictions of Toyotomi Hideyoshi
Television shows based on Japanese novels
Television series set in the 16th century
Television series set in the 17th century